Group A of the WABA League took place between 29 September 2021 and it will end on 15 December 2021.

The four best ranked teams advanced to the SuperLeague.

25 September 2021 Feniks Pale has withdraws from the 2021-22 WABA League. As per the Official Basketball Rules, all games were awarded to their respective opponents with a score of 20-0. Furthermore, the forfeiting team Feniks will receive 0 classification points in the standings.

Standings

Fixtures and results
All times given below are in Central European Time (for the match played in Bulgaria is time expressed in Eastern European Time).

Game 1

Game 2

Game 3

Game 4

Game 5

Game 6

Game 7

Game 8

Game 9

Game 10

References

External links
Official website

Group A
2021–22 in Serbian basketball
2021–22 in Bosnia and Herzegovina basketball
2021–22 in Bulgarian basketball
2021–22 in Slovenian basketball
2021–22 in Montenegrin basketball